Spermatidogenesis is the creation of spermatids from secondary spermatocytes during spermatogenesis.

Secondary spermatocytes produced earlier rapidly enter meiosis II and divide to produce haploid spermatids.

The brevity of this stage means that secondary spermatocytes are rarely seen in histological preparations. Mouse stem cells were grown into cells resembling spermatids in 2016. These spermatids, when injected into mouse eggs, were able to produced pups.

References

Mammal male reproductive system

ru:Сперматогенез